Nikola Vidović (born 23 November 1964) is a Croatian physical coach. He is currently the athletic coach of Riga FC. 

Vidović was the national champion of Croatia at kickboxing. In 2007, he became the athletic coach at FC Ingolstadt 04, a German football club. When the manager, Thorsten Fink, moved to Swiss club FC Basel, in 2009, he brought a number of his training staff with him, including Heiko Vogel and Nikola Vidović. As Fink moved on to his next station as a manager of Hamburger SV in October 2011, Vidović followed him.

After Thorsten Fink moved to Cyprus and signed as APOEL FC coach in January 2015, Vidović worked alongside him as APOEL's fitness coach.

Following Fink's appointment at Vissel Kobe, Vidović worked with stars like Andreas Iniesta, David Villa and Lukas Podolski. Vissel Kobe won the 99th JFA Cup with head coach Thorsten Fink, assistant coach Sebastian Hahn and physical/athletic coach Nikola Vidović. 

Vidović again followed Fink to Riga FC in January 2022.

References

1964 births
Living people
Croatian male kickboxers
FC Basel non-playing staff
Croatian sports coaches